Jiří Petr, Prof., DrSc. Dr.h.c. (13 May 1931 in Hradec Králové – 12 November 2014 in Prague) was a Czech agroscientist, university professor and Emeritus Chancellor (Rector Emeritus) of the Czech University of Agriculture Prague.

Biography
Petr was born on May 13, 1931 Hradec Králové, Czechoslovakia. First he visited the local primary school afterwards the secondary school in Broumov and finished with Matura.
In 1949 he was sent to the Czech Technical University in Prague, Faculty of Agricultural and Forestry Engineering to study plant production with Examination as Dipl.Ing agr.
As postgraduate student he studied special plant production with student exchange in Moscow (RU), Rothamsted (UK) and Halle (former DDR).
After staying in – Norway, Sweden, Denmark, Great Britain, Germany, France, Austria and Spain he published as candidate of agricultural sciences (CSc) the Doctor Thesis: "Biology of alternative wheat forms". During his habilitation with the thesis: "Study of the photoperiodic reaction in cereals and legumes" and the publication "Yield formation in the cereals" he was appointed as lecturer of plant production at Czech University of Agriculture Prague.
In 1989 Petr was nominated as Professor of Plant Production and additional - in 1990 he was elected as Rector of the Czech University of Agriculture Prague.

During his time as Rector (1990–1994) he embraced the windows of change and opened the university gates to globalised science and education and prepared a trustworthy integration of the East and West.

Memberships in Professional Societies
 Member of the Czech Academy of Agriculture, Prague, now honorary member
 State Committee for Scientific Degree, 12 years
 State Committee for Seed  Testing (1990-1995  chairman)
 State Committee for Organic Agriculture
 Member of the International Federation of Organic Agriculture Movement
 The Grant Agency of the Czech Republic - 6 years in the post of the chairman
 Member of the Czechoslovak Society of Arts and Sciences
 Member of the European Society for Agronomy  until 2002
 Honorary member of the Scientific board of the Czech University of Agriculture Prague
 Chairman of the editorial board of the scientific journal Scientia Agriculturae Bohemica SAB (1990–2010)
 Chairman of the editorial board of the Journal for Agricultural Practice  ÚRODA (The Yield)

Field of Research and Publications
Main task agricultural basic and practical research; growth and development processes during ontogenesis in cereals and pulse crops (legumes); biology of cereals; the growth regulators in cereals; the formation of the biological and  economy yield  in cereals and pulse crops (pea and bean); the effect of weather on crop production, integrated crop husbandry; alternative and ecological agriculture, quality of  cereals from conventional and ecological agriculture; quality of cereals for different commercial use.

 Petr, J., Černý, Hruška et al.: Yield Formation in the Main Field Crops, (in Czech ), Prague 1980, in English published by the publishing house Elsevier Amsterdam 1988, in German  DLG Berlin 1983, in Russian by the publishing house Moscow Kolos 1984, in Hungarian  in the publishing house Mezögazdasági Kiádó, Budapest 1985
 Petr, J. ed.: Weather and Yield (in Czech), Prague 1987. In English by Elsevier, Amsterdam, 1991, in Russian published by Moscow Agroizdat, 1990
 Petr, J. et al.: Intensive Cereal Husbandry (in Czech) Prague, 1983, in Russian by Moscow Agroizdat, 1985
 Petr, J., Dlouhý et al.: Ecological Agriculture (in Czech) Prague 1992
 Petr, J.:  Millet - 60 pp. In: Moudry et al. Buckwheat and millet (in Czech), Prague 2006
Additional more than 600 scientific papers and lectures.

Honours and awards
 1984
 Winner of the Literary Prize of the Literary Fund  the Czechoslovak Academy of Sciences for the books: Tvorba výnosu hlavních polních plodin (Formation of the Yield of Main Field Crops). This publication was awarded also in Russian translation in Moscow.
 Other awarded books: Počasí a výnosy (Weather and Yields) and Intenzivní obilnářství (Intensive Cereals Management).
 1981
 "Gold Ear" and Gold Medal  of the Academy of Agriculture, Czech Republic
 1991
 Medal of the Mendel University of Agriculture and Forestry, Brno
 Medal of the Slovak University of Agriculture, Nitra
 Medal of the South Bohemia University, České Budějovice
 1999
 Doctor Honoris Causa at the Swedish University of Agricultural Sciences, Uppsala
 2002
 Komenský Medal from the Ministry of Education, Youth and Sports of the Czech Republic
 Gold Medal of the Czech University of Agriculture Prague
 2006
  Great sculpture The God of Fertility Ops to the tribute of the First Centenary of Agricultural University in Prague

External links
 Webpage Agriculture University Prague
 Scientific Board CULS Prague
 Chair Scientia Agriculturae Bohemica
 Schriftleitung SAB
 GMO Webforum Raupp CULS Prague

References

Literature
 Ceska Zemedelska Universita v Praze: Ceremonial Session of the Scientific Board of the CUA Prague 12 September 2006; .
 Petr, Jiri: Hrsg. Scientia Agriculturae Bohemica; Czech University of Life Sciences Prague, 2007 CS ISSN 1211-3174.
 Gerber, Theophil: Persönlichkeiten aus Land- und Forstwirtschaft, Gartenbau und Veterinärmedizin; Biographisches Lexikon, NORA Verlagsgemeinschaft Dyck & Westerheide, Berlin, 
 Raupp, Manfred (Hrsg; tschechisch): Aktualne problemy ochrana rastlin; Sympozium Stary Smokovec 1986 und 1990.
 Raupp, Manfred (Hrsg); Theoretical and Practical Aspects of the Elements of “Marketing Mix“; Basel, Moskau, Prag; 1994.
 Raupp, Manfred: The Debate concerning the Effects of Bioinformatics on Food Production, Dedicaded to Prof. Dr. Dr. h.c. Jiri Petr to his birthday, Scientia Agriculturae Bohemica CZU Prague 2001; CS ISSN 1211-3174.

1931 births
Scientists from Hradec Králové
Czech agronomists
Czech Technical University in Prague alumni
2014 deaths
Academic staff of the Czech University of Life Sciences Prague
20th-century agronomists
21st-century agronomists